M/S Dalmatia was a cruiseferry owned by the Croatia-based ferry operator Blue Line International operating the Ancona - Hvar route. She was built in 1978 as M/S Pomerania for Polferries.

In 1994, she had a minor collision (referred to as a "scrape") with another cruiseferry, M/S Silja Europa.

She was inserted on the Swinoujscie - Kopenhagen - Felixstowe route. The route was changed in 1979 to Helsinki - Nynäshamn - Gdynia. In 1980 the ship was rented to Kalmar Line for its Kalmar - Rönne route. Kalmar Line was bankrupt in 7/1980 and the ship was inserted to Polferries Karlskrona - Gdynia route. The ship was rented again in 1982 to Cotunav between Genua/ Marseille - Tunis. The ship was returned to Polferries 2 months later. The ship was inserted on the Swinoujscie - Malmö route in 1995. The route was changed again in 1997 to Malmö - Swinoujscie. In 2011 the ship was sold to Blue Line for their Split - Ancona route. The ship was dismantled in Alang, India in 2014.

References

Cruiseferries
1977 ships